The Monk of Monza is a 1963 Italian comedy film directed by Sergio Corbucci. It parodies the story of the Nun of Monza, as depicted in the Alessandro Manzoni's novel The Betrothed.

Plot 
Monza, 1630, a period of Spanish rule. Pasquale Cicciacalda, a humble shoemaker native of Casoria, widower of the midwife  Provvidenza, can not maintain their 12 children (6 pairs of twins) and therefore devises a cunning ploy. Disguised himself and his  children as monks,  vague with them pretending to be poor monks, asking food  and charity.

Cast 
Totò as Friar Pasquale da Casoria (Pasquale Cicciacalda)
Erminio Macario as  Friar Mamozio 
Nino Taranto as  Don Egidio, Marquis de Lattanziis
Lisa Gastoni as  Fiorenza, Marquise del Giglio
Moira Orfei as  Sister Virginia 
Giacomo Furia as  Cecco 
Fiorenzo Fiorentini as  Smilzo 
Adriano Celentano as  Adriano 
Don Backy as the false friar 
Dany París as Fiorenza's waitress
Mario Castellani as the nobleman with two right shoes
Carlo Delle Piane as the innkeeper
Franco Ressel as the official

References

External links

1963 films
1960s historical comedy films
Films directed by Sergio Corbucci
Italian historical comedy films
Films set in the 1630s
Films with screenplays by Giovanni Grimaldi
1963 comedy films
Films based on Italian novels
1960s Italian-language films
1960s Italian films
Films based on works by Alessandro Manzoni